Dhali may refer to:

Places
 Dhali, India
 Dhali, Cyprus
 Dhali, Sindh a town in Sindh, Pakistan

People
Arabinda Dhali, Indian politician